Oliver Jacob Bassett (born 6 March 1998) is a Northern Irish professional footballer player who plays as an attacking midfielder for Canadian club Atlético Ottawa.

Club career

Early career
Born in Packington, Leicestershire, Bassett started his football career as a youngster in the Aston Villa Academy and as a teenager played futsal before signing a scholarship at Southampton in the summer of 2014.

Yeovil Town
On 19 September 2015, Bassett made his Football League debut for Yeovil Town in a 1–0 victory against Crawley Town, at the age of just 17 years, 6 months and 13 days he broke the record for the youngest Yeovil player in the Football League. On 3 December 2015, Bassett was awarded his first professional contract with Yeovil Town, committing him to the club until June 2017.

On 13 September 2016, Bassett joined Southern League Premier Division side Dorchester Town on an initial one-month loan deal. Bassett made his debut the following day as a second-half substitute in Dorchester's 4–0 victory against Frome Town, with Bassett providing the assist for the fourth goal. Having made four appearances in his first loan spell with Dorchester, Bassett returned on loan to the Southern League club on 28 October 2016.

On 3 February 2017, Bassett joined Dorchester for a third loan spell.

At the end of the 2016–17 season, Bassett was released by Yeovil having only made two appearances for the club.

Coalville Town
On 9 August 2017, Bassett signed for Northern Premier League Premier Division club Coalville Town on a one-year contract.

Waitakere United
Following his release from Coalville, Bassett secured a contract with New Zealand Football Championship side Waitakere United.

Pacific FC
Following a stint with Nuneaton Borough, Bassett signed with Canadian Premier League side Pacific FC on 29 April 2021. In his season with the Tridents, Bassett contributed with 2 goals and 3 assists as Pacific won the league. After a strong start to the season, Bassett started to see his minutes decrease as the season progressed, and did not play a single minute in the playoffs. Despite interest from the club to trigger his club option for next season, Bassett preferred to move on and find an opportunity to play more regular minutes elsewhere.  In January 2022, Pacific confirmed that Bassett had left the club.

Atlético Ottawa
On 26 January 2022, Bassett switched to Canadian Premier League side Atlético Ottawa signing a two-year contract with an option for a third year. On Jun 9, 2022, capping off a hot start to the season, Bassett was named the CPL's Player of the Month for the month of May 2022. On October 28, 2022, he was awarded the CPL’s Player of the Year and Player’s Player of the Year awards.

International career
In August 2016, Bassett was called up to the Northern Ireland under-19 side for a training camp. Bassett did enough to impress the Northern Ireland coaching staff to receive a call-up for their 2017 UEFA European Under-19 Championship qualification matches in October 2016. On 6 October 2016, Bassett made his debut for Northern Ireland under-19s against Slovakia in a 1–0 defeat.

Career statistics

Honours
Pacific FC
Canadian Premier League: 2021

Atlético Ottawa
 Canadian Premier League
Regular Season: 2022
CCSG Golden Scarf: 2022
Player of the Year Award: 2022
Player’s Player of the Year Award: 2022

References

External links

1998 births
Living people
Association football midfielders
English footballers
Association footballers from Northern Ireland
People from North West Leicestershire District
Footballers from Leicestershire
English expatriate footballers
Expatriate association footballers from Northern Ireland
Expatriate association footballers in New Zealand
English expatriate sportspeople in New Zealand
Expatriate sportspeople from Northern Ireland in New Zealand
Expatriate soccer players in Canada
English expatriate sportspeople in Canada
Expatriate sportspeople from Northern Ireland in Canada
Yeovil Town F.C. players
Dorchester Town F.C. players
Coalville Town F.C. players
Gresley F.C. players
Waitakere United players
Team Wellington players
Nuneaton Borough F.C. players
Pacific FC players
Atlético Ottawa players
English Football League players
Southern Football League players
Northern Premier League players
New Zealand Football Championship players
Northern Ireland youth international footballers